Sushmita Sen is an Indian actress known for her work in Hindi cinema and two Tamil films. She made her debut in 1996 with Mahesh Bhatt's thriller Dastak. She then starred in the Tamil-language romantic action film Ratchagan (1997). In 1999, Sen won the Filmfare Award for Best Supporting Actress for her portrayal of a model in David Dhawan's critically and commercially successful comedy-drama Biwi No.1. Her next release was the musical drama Sirf Tum the same year. The film earned her critical appreciation and was financially successful. She also attained commercial recognition for her performance of the song "Dilbar". She had two releases in 2001: fantasy comedy film Kyo Kii... Main Jhuth Nahin Bolta and romantic drama Bas Itna Sa Khwaab Hai. Both films failed to create an impact at the box office.

In 2002, Sen appeared in Meghna Gulzar's Filhaal..., a film on the theme of surrogacy. In 2003, she played the role of a policewoman in the thriller Samay: When Time Strikes. It proved to be a critical success earning Sen appreciation for her performance. In the same year, she starred in the ensemble heist film Aankhen which was the fifth highest-grossing Hindi film of that year. Her biggest hit of 2004 was Farah Khan's Main Hoon Na, in which she played the role of a chemistry teacher. The same year she appeared in the horror film Vaastu Shastra. She gained further recognition by featuring in the 2005 romantic comedy Maine Pyaar Kyun Kiya? Inspired by a French play, Fleur de cactus, it emerged as one of the highest-grossing Hindi films of the year. In the same year Sen acted in the drama Main Aisa Hi Hoon, a remake of the Hollywood film I Am Sam.

Sen then appeared in the Bengali–English film It Was Raining That Night, which would have been her debut role in both of these languages, but it did not get a theatrical release. Kalpana Lajmi's Chingaari (2006) and Tanuja Chandra's Zindaggi Rocks (2006) in which she played a lead role, performed badly at the box office. Sen continued to star in a series of films that did not do well commercially, including action drama Ram Gopal Varma Ki Aag (2007),  romantic drama Karma Aur Holi (2009), romantic comedy Dulha Mil Gaya (2010) and  action comedy No Problem (2010). After taking a career break for five years, Sen appeared in her first Bengali film Nirbaak, directed by Srijit Mukherji in 2015. In 2020, she made her television debut by playing the title role in Ram Madhvani's Aarya. Her role as a housewife forced into the narcotics trade was well received by the critics.

Films 
All films are in Hindi, unless otherwise noted.

Television

References

External links 
 

Indian filmographies
Actress filmographies